Domna C. Stanton is an American professor, currently a Distinguished Professor of French at City University of New York

References

Year of birth missing (living people)
Living people
City University of New York faculty
21st-century American historians
Place of birth missing (living people)
Presidents of the Modern Language Association